Lake Altham, part of the Lake Grace System, is a wetland located in the Great Southern region of Western Australia. Situated in the Shire of Kent, the lake is part of the Western Mallee subregion of the Mallee region.

See also

 List of lakes of Western Australia

References

Altham, Lake
DIWA-listed wetlands
Altham